Giuseppe Colucci (born Penna San Giovanni, 19 March 1752 - died Fermo, 16 March 1809) was a prolific regional historian of the Marche and writer on the antiquities of central Italy; his works include Antichità Picene in 30 volumes, and Antichità Ascolane.

Sources 
 
 

1752 births
1809 deaths